Asura parallelina is a moth of the family Erebidae. It is found in Myanmar and Thailand.

References

parallelina
Moths described in 1894
Moths of Asia